Lørenskog Storsenter (often referred to by its original name Triaden, or Triaden Lørenskog Storsenter) is a shopping centre in Lørenskog, Norway. It has over 80 stores in 27,000 m2 of building space on three floors. Lørenskog Storsenter was bought by Olav Thon in 1992.

External links
 Official website

Buildings and structures in Viken
Shopping centres in Norway
Lørenskog
Buildings and structures completed in 1988
Shopping malls established in 1988
Tourist attractions in Viken